Easton is an unincorporated community and census-designated place (CDP) in Kittitas County, Washington, United States. The population was 478 at the 2010 census.

History
Easton was platted in 1902. It was given its name by the Northern Pacific Railway due its location near the east end of the Stampede Tunnel through the Cascade Range.

Geography
Easton is located in western Kittitas County at  (47.238368, -121.178327), in the Yakima River valley. Interstate 90 passes through the community, with access from Exits 70 and 71. I-90 leads northwest over Snoqualmie Pass  to Seattle and southeast  to Ellensburg, the Kittitas county seat.

Lake Easton, a reservoir at the junction of the Yakima and Kachess rivers, and Lake Easton State Park are at the west end of the community.

Climate
This region experiences warm (but not hot) and dry summers, with no average monthly temperatures above 71.6 °F.  According to the Köppen Climate Classification system, Easton has a warm-summer Mediterranean climate, abbreviated "Csb" on climate maps.

Demographics

As of the census of 2000, there were 383 people, 151 households, and 104 families residing in the CDP. The population density was 227.3 people per square mile (88.0/km2). There were 228 housing units at an average density of 135.3/sq mi (52.4/km2). The racial makeup of the CDP was 91.91% White, 0.78% Native American, 6.53% from other races, and 0.78% from two or more races. Hispanic or Latino of any race were 9.14% of the population.

There were 151 households, out of which 35.1% had children under the age of 18 living with them, 54.3% were married couples living together, 7.3% had a female householder with no husband present, and 31.1% were non-families. 21.9% of all households were made up of individuals, and 4.0% had someone living alone who was 65 years of age or older. The average household size was 2.54 and the average family size was 2.94.

In the CDP, the population was spread out, with 28.7% under the age of 18, 7.3% from 18 to 24, 29.5% from 25 to 44, 23.0% from 45 to 64, and 11.5% who were 65 years of age or older. The median age was 35 years. For every 100 females, there were 124.0 males. For every 100 females age 18 and over, there were 125.6 males.

The median income for a household in the CDP was $37,708, and the median income for a family was $37,917. Males had a median income of $33,750 versus $20,357 for females. The per capita income for the CDP was $19,773. About 3.7% of families and 7.5% of the population were below the poverty line, including 2.7% of those under age 18 and 26.7% of those age 65 or over.

Notable people
 Sherwood Egbert, president of the Studebaker-Packard and Studebaker corporations

Points of interest

 Lake Easton State Park
 Iron Horse State Park, former right-of-way for the Milwaukee Road which today serves as a path for bikers, hikers, cross-country skiers and horseback riders

See also
 Kachess Lake
 Stampede Pass

References

Census-designated places in Kittitas County, Washington
Census-designated places in Washington (state)
Populated places on the Yakima River